In ring theory, a Peirce decomposition  is a decomposition of an algebra as a sum of eigenspaces of commuting idempotent elements. 

Peirce decomposition for associative algebras

If e is an idempotent (e2 = e) in an associative algebra A, then the two-sided Peirce decomposition writes A as the direct sum of eAe, eA(1 − e), (1 − e)Ae, and (1 − e)A(1 − e). There are also left and right Peirce decompositions, where the left decomposition writes A as the direct sum of eA and (1 − e)A, and the right one writes A as the direct sum of Ae and A(1 − e).

More generally, if e1, ..., en are mutually orthogonal idempotents with sum 1, then A is the direct sum of the spaces eiAej for 1 ≤ i, j ≤ n.

Blocks

An idempotent of a ring is called central if it commutes with all elements of the ring.

Two idempotents e, f are called orthogonal if ef = fe = 0.

An idempotent is called primitive if it is nonzero and cannot be written as the sum of two orthogonal nonzero idempotents.

An idempotent e is called a block or centrally primitive if it is nonzero and central and cannot be written as the sum of two orthogonal nonzero central idempotents. In this case the ideal eR is also sometimes called a block.

If the identity 1 of a ring R can be written as the sum
1 = e1 + ... + en
of orthogonal nonzero centrally primitive idempotents, then these idempotents are unique up to order and are called the blocks or the ring R. In this case the ring R can be written as a direct sum 
R = e1R + ... + enR
of indecomposable rings, which are sometimes also called the blocks of R.

References

External links
 
Peirce decomposition on http://www.tricki.org/

Algebras